Annick De Ridder (born 4 February 1979) is a Belgian politician for the N-VA and a member of the Flemish Parliament.

De Ridder graduated with a degree in law from UFSIA before completing a postgraduate degree in finance from KU Leuven.  She worked for Katoen Natie and from 2014 to 2015 was again a director of the Antwerp Port Authority. De Ridder initially began her political career in the Open VLD and was elected to Antwerp municipal council and the Flemish Parliament for the party in 2004 before stepping down in 2011 to focus on her professional career. She left the Open VLD in 2013 due to disagreeing with the course of the party after it chose to participate in Elio Di Rupo's government and switched her support to the New Flemish Alliance. In 2018, she was re-elected as a municipal councilor of Antwerp for the N-VA and returned to the Flemish Parliament in 2019.

References 

Living people
1979 births
Members of the Flemish Parliament
New Flemish Alliance politicians
Politicians from Antwerp
KU Leuven alumni
21st-century Belgian women politicians
21st-century Belgian politicians
Belgian senators of the 56th legislature